The following is a list of characters that first appeared in the BBC soap opera EastEnders in 1995, by order of first appearance.

Tiffany Mitchell

Tiffany Mitchell (also Raymond) is played by Martine McCutcheon from 1995 until 1998. The character was created by the writer, Tony Jordan. She is introduced as a school friend of Bianca Jackson (Patsy Palmer) and becomes a prominent and popular character during her tenure due to a combustible relationship with the soap's landlord, Grant Mitchell (Ross Kemp). McCutcheon quit the role in 1998 to pursue a musical career. Introduced in 1995 by series producer Barbara Emile, Tiffany Raymond was conceptualised by EastEnders scriptwriter Tony Jordan as a school friend of already established character, Bianca Jackson. Actress Martine McCutcheon was cast in the role. McCutcheon has revealed that she was initially hesitant about auditioning for the part, commenting to The Guardian, "An agent called me and said there was a part on EastEnders and I said, very offhandedly, 'I don't really want to do soap, because I want to do movies, and nobody I know goes from soap to movies, and it's just not the sort of actress I want to be [...] this agent said to me, just let me send you a synopsis of the character and see what you think, and I thought she was fantastic. And I watched EastEnders that night and I realised just how many people talked about it. So I told my agent, 'All right, I'm going to go for it, I'm not in a position to be fussy".

Andrea Price

Andrea Price, played by Cindy O'Callaghan, is the mother of Natalie Price (Lucy Speed). During 1994 and 1995 she lives at 87 George Street with Natalie. Although she isn't seen often on screen, she is referred to regularly by her daughter and depicted as the "mother from hell". After Natalie has an affair with Ricky Butcher (Sid Owen) – her best friend, Bianca Jackson (Patsy Palmer)'s boyfriend – Andrea sends her to her sister's in Basingstoke in February 1995 to avoid the wrath of the Jackson family. Sometime later, Andrea also leaves Walford to move near to the rest of the Price family. Natalie had not spoken to her mother for several years before they are reunited in August 1999 by Natalie's meddling fiancé, Barry Evans (Shaun Williamson).

Natalie had always had a tempestuous relationship with her boozy mother. Andrea favoured her eldest daughter Susie (Viva Duce) and would constantly make it clear that Natalie wasn't good enough. Things have not improved in the time since they have been apart, and upon Natalie's arrival Andrea gets extremely drunk and proceeds to embarrass and humiliate her in front of Barry. She picks holes in her appearance, brands her a waste of space, and blames her for her own fleeting looks, her failure to make it as a singer and even for the break-up of her marriage to Natalie's father. Upon witnessing Andrea's true colours and seeing how upset she made Natalie, Barry prohibits her from having any part in their lives.

However, in November of that year, Andrea turns up on Natalie's doorstep. She has won some money playing bingo and wants to help pay for Natalie's wedding. Natalie is opposed to the idea, but she is struggling to fund the wedding so she begrudgingly accepts. Andrea proceeds to take over the whole organisation of the wedding, concocting themes and colour codes, which only infuriates an already stressed Natalie. Andrea manages to offend Natalie's future father-in-law, Roy Evans (Tony Caunter), by goading him for not paying anything towards the wedding, which causes a huge row between Andrea and Roy's wife, Pat Evans (Pam St. Clement), who is already offended after Andrea tells her that she has bad taste.

On Natalie's joint hen night with Mel Healy (Tamzin Outhwaite) in Amsterdam, Andrea, true to form, gets extremely drunk and delights in making a fool of her daughter yet again. After chatting Barry up (who is also there on his stag night) and cruelly telling Natalie that he is having second thoughts, she proceeds to kiss him right in front of her. Natalie is devastated, but the final straw comes when she discovers that her mother has arranged an Adam and Eve themed wedding. Horrified, Natalie calls off the wedding, after which Barry banishes Andrea from their lives for a second time. Natalie and Barry manage to patch things up and marry on New Year's Eve. Andrea attends, but despite her best efforts, she is restrained from having anything to do with the wedding.

Andrea Price was the second role that Cindy O'Callaghan played in EastEnders, having previously played Stella, the mistress of Ashraf Karim (Aftab Sachak), from 1989 to 1990.

Lydia

Lydia, played by Marlaine Gordon, is a recurring character appearing between 1995 and 1996. Lydia is first seen in Walford in March 1995, when she is hired as an apprentice hairdresser by Della Alexander (Michelle Joseph). She is a bit obnoxious and likes to gossip, and she often ends up infuriating her employer, particularly as she is often the topic of the gossip. Lydia loses her job in May that year when Della decides to move away from Walford. Audacious Lydia spends the last few days of her employment badmouthing Della to anyone who will listen and boasting about a new job she is applying for in an upper class salon. She then gives Della her reference to sign, which describes her as popular, bubbly and humorous. Della has the last laugh however, when she re-writes the reference depicting her as obnoxious and useless. A furious Lydia then leaves, uttering a tirade of homophobic abuse at her lesbian employer as she goes.

Later in the year Lydia comes back to Walford to apply for a job at Ian Beale (Adam Woodyatt)'s chip shop. She is rejected after a disastrous interview, but manages to get herself a job working on Sanjay (Deepak Verma) and Gita Kapoor (Shobu Kapoor)'s market stall instead. She soon starts dating the philandering chef Steve Elliot (Mark Monero). Steve, who has always run a mile from commitment in the past, seems quite taken with Lydia, and in 1996, the two move into a flat together. In February, Steve gets into trouble with a criminal firm, who refuse to allow him to testify at a trial, which they fear will place them under a police investigation. After several threats Steve decides not to testify, but this earns the scorn of Lydia and she manages to persuade him to go through with it. To change his mind the firm kidnapped Lydia. Steve is frantic, but he eventually finds a distraught Lydia, who informs him that the mobsters have attempted to drown her and threatened to kill her if he doesn't back out of testifying. Fearful for his girlfriend's life, Steve packs his things and both he and Lydia leave Walford later that night. Their last appearance is in February 1996.

Willy Roper

Willy Roper, played by Michael Tudor Barnes, was introduced to EastEnders on 1 June 1995, and departed on 20 June 1996. He was a villainous character, and was later dubbed "Wicked Willy" by the British press after he framed Arthur Fowler (Bill Treacher) for embezzlement, leading to Arthur being falsely imprisoned. The truth was later uncovered by Arthur's wife Pauline (Wendy Richard), though it was too late for Arthur – he died shortly after his release due a head injury he sustained in a prison riot.

Ted Hills

Ted Hills, played by Brian Croucher, is introduced in 1995 as the patriarch of the Hills family, who are the extended family of established character Kathy Beale (Gillian Taylforth). Ted was axed in 1997. Brian Croucher was selected to play Ted Hills after auditioning for the part of Roy Evans in 1994. Croucher was short-listed to play Roy, a love interest for Pat Butcher (Pam St Clement), but the show ultimately decided they did not want to use him for Roy and instead cast him as Ted Hills, the older brother of original character Kathy Beale. Ted is the patriarch of a family of three introduced in 1995. In his storyline, Ted moves back to Walford, the area he was born and raised in, with his son Tony Hills (Mark Homer) and daughter Sarah Hills (Daniela Denby-Ashe). In 1997, Brian Croucher was axed from the show. It was reported that his character Ted would "go out with a bang".  A source said, "Brian was near the end of his contract and it was an opportunity to create a classic EastEnders moment."

Tony Hills

Tony Hills, played by Mark Homer, is first shown on screen on 7 September 1995 after arriving from Norfolk with his sister, Sarah Hills (Daniella Denby-Ashe). At first, he is painted as an unsympathetic character; at one point he sells ecstasy with a friend, Dan Zappieri. Eventually, he quits dealing after Dan gives Sarah ecstasy without her knowledge. Homer's departure from EastEnders was announced in late 1998, along with that of his co-star Andrew Lynford. They both decided to leave following discussions with the executive producer Matthew Robinson, and a spokesperson for the programme said "They have mutually agreed that both characters have fulfilled their potential and will conclude their stories with a dramatic exit." Their departures left only one gay character in the UK's mainstream soap operas, that of Zoe Tate (Leah Bracknell) in Emmerdale. Gay campaigning group Stonewall's spokesman Matt Aston commented on this, saying: "Gay characters did seem to be on the rise for a while, but now they've got a bit of a low profile. We'd like to see a few more positive role models in the media, especially to encourage young people who are coming to terms with their sexuality, as well as their friends and members of their family." However, Aston praised the way Tony's sexuality was handled, saying, "It was very good for breaking what had been a taboo on prime-time television. It was a positive portrayal of how people can be confused about their sexuality. And as with any kind of exposure of these issues, people are made more aware of them and the problems people have with their sexuality. People also link them with us and get in touch to talk about it." EastEnders first gay kiss attracted criticism, but it was noted that by the time Tony and Simon had their first kiss, "fewer feathers were left to be ruffled."

Sarah Hills

Sarah Hills, played by Daniela Denby-Ashe appears between 1995 and 1999. Sarah is the daughter of Irene (Roberta Taylor) and Ted Hills (Brian Croucher). Sarah arrives on Albert Square with her dad Ted and brother Tony Hills (Mark Homer). Over a dinner party with her family, Ted is forced to admit that his business is in trouble when a boy was killed after falling off scaffolding and the boy's family was harassing them. Sarah is also rather troublesome shoplifting from various market stalls. This is noticed by Alistair Matthews (Neil Clark), a shop manager and religious cult leader who makes Sarah turn to religion to avoid being turned in to the police. Sarah finds God and becomes friends with local vicar Alex Healy (Richard Driscoll). She has sex with Robbie Jackson (Dean Gaffney) but is ashamed of what she has done and runs away to live rough on the streets. The fallout results in Ricky Butcher (Sid Owen), who finds Sarah in the aftermath, being questioned as a suspect and  Sarah's father Ted attacking Robbie accusing him of raping her and landing him in hospital. When she returns home, her dad refuses to believe Robbie didn't rape her and Sarah is shocked to learn what he did to Robbie. Sarah moves in with her aunt, Kathy Mitchell (Gillian Taylforth), Kathy's husband Phil Mitchell (Steve McFadden) and her cousin Ben Mitchell (Matthew Silver). Kathy tries to get Sarah and Ted to make up, but Sarah is disgusted with her dad's violent behaviour. She reports her dad to the police for assaulting Robbie and Ted is arrested. When Sarah and Ted attempt to make amends, things go well until Sarah believes that Ted thinks he did the right thing. She also gets engaged twice, firstly to Joe Wicks (Paul Nicholls) and later to Matthew Rose (Joe Absolom). The former relationship ends when Joe has sex with Mary Flaherty (Melanie Clark Pullen) and the latter ends when Sarah finds out Matthew only wants her for sex. Sarah's last appearance is at Matthew's trial, when he is convicted of the murder of Saskia Duncan (Deborah Sheridan Taylor) in October 1999 – although the real killer is Steve Owen (Martin Kemp). She then leaves Walford to attend university. It has since been mentioned that Sarah reconciled with Joe several years later.

Guppy Sharma

Gopal "Guppy" Sharma, played by Lyndam Gregory, is a recurring character appearing between 1995 and 1996. Guppy is first seen in October 1995, approaching market trader Gita Kapoor (Shobu Kapoor) about a business proposition whereby he would supply her with mock designer clothing for her stall at cut price. While Gita's husband Sanjay (Deepak Verma) is out of the country tending to a dying relative, Gita grows close to Guppy; a flirtatious relationship begins.

Gita grows suspicious of Guppy when he is beaten up by his former employer – an owner of a sweatshop – who is angry that Guppy has set up business alone. He refuses to tell Gita who his current business partner is. He pursues Gita, buying her flowers and attempting to kiss her, until he is followed and confronted by his business partner, Gita's sister, Meena McKenzie (Sudha Bhuchar). Gita had disowned her sister 2 years prior for having an affair with her husband, and in an attempt to reconcile with Gita, Meena had persuaded Guppy to offer her cheap business on her behalf. It transpires that Guppy is Meena's fiancé, and Meena grows angry when she discovers that Guppy has been wooing Gita. Arguments between the sisters resurface with Meena refusing to believe that Guppy feels anything for Gita other than pity; she opts to go ahead with her plan to marry Guppy. The Kapoors decide to end their business arrangement with Guppy just as they are noticed selling counterfeit goods by the market inspector, Lesley. Guppy bribes Lesley, but they are witnessed by police and both are arrested. When Guppy reappears, he informs Sanjay that his wedding to Meena never took place. He persuades Sanjay to invest £2,000 in a business venture and then steals his money, leaving Sanjay in debt with a loan shark.

After almost a month of not been heard of or being seen, Guppy suddenly rings Gita out of the blue at the Cafe and arranges to meet her in secret. When Gita meets Guppy with the knowledge of Sanjay, she is shocked at the condition of the accommodation he is now living and the dishevelled state Guppy himself is in. It transpires that Guppy has used the £2000 he stole from Sanjay to pay off some associates. It also appears that Guppy is still holding a torch for Gita and is still hopefully they can get together as a couple. However Gita angrily warns Guppy to stay away from Walford or she cannot account for what Sanjay would do if he came across Guppy again.

Felix Kawalski

Felix Kawalski, played by Harry Landis, is a Jewish-Polish immigrant who sets up a barbershop in Walford. A survivor of the Holocaust, Felix has spent his life searching for his family to no avail. He assumes they had all perished in the Nazi concentration camps, so he is thrilled when he finally makes contact with his surviving sister. Felix is first seen in November 1995 when he moves to Walford to open a barber shop. He is interested in brass band music, and when he notices Sonia Jackson (Natalie Cassidy) attempting to play the trumpet he tries to offer her the benefit of his wisdom. However, Sonia takes his kind gesture the wrong way and tells her stepfather Alan (Howard Antony). Thinking that Felix is a paedophile, Alan immediately warns him to stay away from Sonia. Intimidated, Felix agrees. Rumours about Felix begin to spread around Walford, leading Sonia and her friend Clare Tyler (Gemma Bissix) to think that he had murdered his wife, cut her to pieces and buried her in the basement of his shop. They are terrified of him, even more so when Clare enters the shop on a dare and notices that he has a cut throat razor. Clare runs away when Felix refuses to tell her what is in his basement, and she immediately assumes his dead wife must have been down there. She, Sonia and Janine Butcher (Alexia Demetriou) steal Felix's keys and sneak into the dark basement where Clare trips and knocks herself out. Panicking, Sonia and Janine run to The Queen Victoria public house and tell Clare's stepfather Nigel Bates (Paul Bradley) that she has been kidnapped. Nigel, Grant (Ross Kemp) and Phil Mitchell (Steve McFadden), find Felix unbuttoning Clare's clothing and immediately suspect the worst. Grant attacks Felix and only stops when Clare tells him that Felix is merely taking care of her, following her fall. As she looks around the cellar, she discovers that all Felix has to hide is a vast collection of butterflies.

The residents all apologise to Felix the next day, and they learn the story behind Felix's collection of butterflies. They learn that Felix is a Polish Jew who had been living in Kraków during World War II when Germany invaded and most Jewish residents were placed in Nazi concentration camps. Felix's father refused to flee Poland, as he would not leave his precious collection of butterflies behind. When the Nazis came to arrest his family, he and his sister hid, but he sneezed, revealing their hiding place. His sister was found but Felix escaped with a small box of butterflies. He travelled from Poland to England, where he was taken in by his uncle. He believed that the rest of his family had perished, and blamed himself for his sister's death. He continued to collect butterflies in his father's honour ever since. Felix befriends the other senior residents of Walford, Jules Tavernier (Tommy Eytle), Ethel Skinner (Gretchen Franklin), Blossom Jackson (Mona Hammond) and Nellie Ellis (Elizabeth Kelly). He and Jules often play chess together in The Queen Victoria pub. Felix is left furious during a chess tournament when Jules keels over while asleep, scattering the chess pieces in the process. Even though Felix does not know where his family are or even if they are still alive, he has spent his life trying to find them. He eventually discovers that his sister has survived and she is living in Israel. After making contact with her, he decides to leave Walford to live there with her. He later returns for a brief visit in May 1997 to tie up some loose ends. On his return, he asks Blossom Jackson to go on holiday to Israel with him, and they depart that month. The hint of romance between Felix and Blossom remains just that, and Blossom returns to England. When Blossom returns for her great grandson Billie's (Devon Anderson) funeral in October 2010, she reveals she and Felix had reconciled but he had died of an illness five years previously.

April Branning

April Branning, played by Debbie Arnold, is the eldest daughter of Jim (John Bardon). The character is introduced in December 1995 as the "fun-loving" sister of Carol Jackson (Lindsey Coulson). Her entrance storyline is part of a plot that leads to the marriage of Carol and her boyfriend Alan (Howard Antony) – when April is jilted at the altar, Carol and Alan marry in her place. The character is turned into a regular in 1996, moving to the soap's setting of Albert Square. At the time, Jaci Stephen, television critic for The Mirror described April as a kind of character "who, from the moment they open their mouths, appear to have been around for ever." She added, "She has bleached blonde hair, overdresses and has the kind of flirtatious manner guaranteed to drive the Square's women to violence. As April grows more glamorous Cindy (Michelle Collins) grows more dowdy."

Others

References

1995
, EastEnders
EastEnders